The Kumbe is a river of Merauke Regency, Papua Province, Indonesia. It has a distinct meandering course, with a total length of 242 km, and width around 97–700.1 m. The Bian River and the Maro River are part of the same basin.

Geography
The river flows in the southern area of Papua with predominantly tropical monsoon climate (designated as Am in the Köppen-Geiger climate classification). The annual average temperature in the area is 23 °C. The warmest month is November, when the average temperature is around 26 °C, and the coldest is June, at 21 °C. The average annual rainfall is 2160 mm. The wettest month is January, with an average of 399 mm rainfall, and the driest is August, with 26 mm rainfall.

References

Rivers of South Papua
Rivers of Indonesia